Hypsibarbus macrosquamatus is a little known species of ray-finned fish in the genus Hypsibarbus, it is known only from the Red River basin in northern Vietnam.

Footnotes 

 

Macrosquamatus
Fish described in 1978
Fish of Vietnam
Endemic fauna of Vietnam